Ash & Ice is the fifth studio album by indie rock band the Kills, released on June 3, 2016, through Domino.
The album was recorded in a rented house in Los Angeles and at Electric Lady Studios in New York City. It was produced by Jamie Hince and co-produced by John O'Mahoney. It was promoted by the singles "Doing It to Death" and "Heart of a Dog".

Formats and packaging
The album was made available as a CD – with a 20-page booklet with lyrics and album artwork – and as digital download.

A limited-edition double LP was also made available. The LPs are coloured in blue and pink and packaged into a wide spine jacket with a gold foil imprint. The release also includes two fold-out posters, two printed inner sleeves and an exclusive lyric zine, with the first 250 orders signed by the band.

Promotion
The lead single from the album, "Doing It to Death", was released on March 1, 2016. It was accompanied by a music video directed by Wendy Morgan.
The second single from the album, "Heart of a Dog", and an accompanying music video directed by Sophie Muller, were released on April 18, 2016.
"Siberian Nights" was released as the third single on May 24, 2016. A music video promoting the song was directed by American actor Giovanni Ribisi.

In support of the album, the band toured the United States from March to June 2016. The Kills also performed in Mexico City on March 16, in Amsterdam, Paris, London, Toronto and Vancouver in May 2016, and at the Isle of Wight Festival in June. In July, played at the U-Park Festival in Kyiv, Ukraine, and at the Park Live Festival in Moscow, Russia, as well as the Off Festival in Katowice, Poland, in August before returning to the U.S. in September and then back to Europe through October and November. They performed "Whirling Eye" on The Late Late Show with James Corden on the October 21, 2016, episode.

Critical reception

Ash & Ice received generally positive reviews from music critics. At Metacritic, which assigns a normalized rating out of 100 to reviews from mainstream critics, the album received an average score of 68, based on 21 reviews. Writing for Exclaim!, Laura Sciarpelletti praised the band's "bare bones power technique".

Track listing

Sample credits
 "Heart of a Dog" contains a sample of "Wildfire" performed by Sbtrkt featuring Little Dragon
 "Days of Why and How" contains a sample of "Is There Any Love" performed by Trevor Dandy
 "Let It Drop" contains a sample from "IMC" performed by Spank Rock
 "Siberian Nights" uses elements from "UFO" written by Renee Scroggins
 "Impossible Tracks" contains a sample of "I Thank the Lord" performed by the Mighty Voices of Wonder

Personnel
Credits adapted from the liner notes of Ash & Ice.

The Kills
 Alison Mosshart
 Jamie Hince – drum programming

Additional musicians
 Dean Fertita – piano 
 Homer Steinweiss – drums

Technical
 Jamie Hince – production
 John O'Mahoney – co-production
 Tom Elmhirst – mixing 
 Joe Visciano – engineering for mix 
 Brandon Bost – mixing assistance 
 Tchad Blake – mixing 
 Phil Joly – engineering
 Barry McCready – recording assistance
 Bill Skibbe – engineering
 Vanessa Silberman – recording assistance
 Jon Gilbert – recording assistance
 Kurt Uenala – drum editing, additional production
 Brian Lucey – mastering

Artwork
 Alison Mosshart – interior artwork, photographs
 Jamie Hince – photographs
 Brian Roettinger – design

Charts

Notes

References

2016 albums
Albums produced by Jamie Hince
Albums recorded at Electric Lady Studios
Domino Recording Company albums
The Kills albums